Khapachev is a rural locality (a khutor) in Khakurinokhablskoye Rural Settlement of Shovgenovsky District, the Republic of Adygea, Russia. The population was 216 as of 2018. There are 7 streets.

Geography 
Khapachev is located in the north of Adygea, 12 km north of Khakurinokhabl (the district's administrative centre) by road. Kirov is the nearest rural locality.

Ethnicity 
The khutor is inhabited by Russians, Tatars, Ukrainians and representatives of Dagestan peoples.

References 

Rural localities in Shovgenovsky District